John Burrowes (born 28 December 1944) is a Jamaican sailor. He competed in the Dragon event at the 1972 Summer Olympics.

References

External links
 

1944 births
Living people
Jamaican male sailors (sport)
Olympic sailors of Jamaica
Sailors at the 1972 Summer Olympics – Dragon
Place of birth missing (living people)